Tashk (also Romanized as Tāshk and Ţāshk) is a village in Ravar Rural District, in the Central District of Ravar County, Kerman Province, Iran. At the 2006 census, its population was 228, in 79 families.

References 

Populated places in Ravar County